Gloucester County may refer to:

 Gloucestershire, a county in the U.K. after which the others are named
 Gloucester County, New South Wales, Australia
 Gloucester County, New Brunswick, Canada
 Gloucester County, New Jersey, U.S.
 Gloucester County, Virginia, U.S.